José García Requena (23 July 1955 – 28 February 2014) was a professional tennis player from Spain.

Career
García Requena, who was from Barcelona, represented Spain in a 1981 Davis Cup tie against Algeria in Algiers. He played two singles rubbers which he both won, over Yassine Amier and Djamel Boudjemline. Three months later he won the Layetano Challenger tournament in Barcelona. He beat Mark Dickson in the final.

In 1982 he managed a win over Manuel Orantes in Nice and had his best performance in a Grand Prix tournament when he made the semi-finals of the Bavarian Tennis Championships in Munich. He made the main draw of the 1982 French Open but was unable to get past American Lloyd Bourne in the first round.

Retiring from professional tennis in 1986, he remained involved in tennis as head of the Real Club Recreativo de Tenis de Huelva.

Challenger titles

Singles: (1)

See also
List of Spain Davis Cup team representatives

References

External links
 
 
 

1955 births
2014 deaths
Spanish male tennis players
Tennis players from Barcelona
Sportspeople from Almería